Makayla Epps (born June 6, 1995) is an American  professional women's basketball player. She last played for the Chicago Sky of the Women's National Basketball Association (WNBA). She was drafted from the University of Kentucky with the 33rd overall pick in the 2017 WNBA Draft.

She is the daughter of former University of Kentucky player, Anthony Epps, who was a member of the national champion 1995–96 Kentucky Wildcats men's basketball team.

Kentucky statistics
Source

References

1995 births
Living people
American women's basketball players
Basketball players from Kentucky
Chicago Sky draft picks
Chicago Sky players
Kentucky Wildcats women's basketball players
McDonald's High School All-Americans
Parade High School All-Americans (girls' basketball)
People from Lebanon, Kentucky
Point guards
Sportswomen from Kentucky